Robert Harwell Henley was the first Mayor of Birmingham, Alabama from 1871 until 1872.

Life
Robert was born the son of attorney John Woodson Henley on January 20, 1843. He moved with his wife Amelia Peters to Elyton and founded the weekly newspaper Elyton Sun, which later became the Birmingham Sun, the city of Birmingham's first newspaper.

He became the first mayor of Birmingham after the city's incorporation on 19 December 1871, appointed by Robert B. Lindsay, the Alabama Governor at the time.

In 1872, he considered a run for state Senate, but withdrew on account of ill health. He contracted tuberculosis during his term of office and died on April 22, 1873 at the age of 30. He was buried at Oak Hill Cemetery in Birmingham.

References

1843 births
1873 deaths
People from Demopolis, Alabama
Editors of Alabama newspapers
Mayors of Birmingham, Alabama